Orawan Wongkamalasai (born 25 August 1981) is a Thai former professional tennis player.

Wongkamalasai, who had a best world ranking of 426, made her only WTA Tour main draw appearance as a wildcard at the 1998 Pattaya Open and was beaten in the first round by eighth seed Wang Shi-ting.

In 1999 she was a Southeast Asian Games gold medalist for Thailand in the mixed doubles (with Vittaya Samrej).

ITF finals

Singles: 1 (0–1)

Doubles: 4 (0–4)

References

External links
 
 

1981 births
Living people
Orawan Wongkamalasai
Competitors at the 1999 Southeast Asian Games
Southeast Asian Games medalists in tennis
Orawan Wongkamalasai
Orawan Wongkamalasai
Orawan Wongkamalasai